In response to the Millennium Development Goals' focus on maternal and child health, the Philippines began the National Demographic and Health Survey in 1968 to assess the effectiveness of public health programs in the country.

Barriers to healthcare 
Poor communities suffer a higher burden of disease due to inequities in access to services and health status. Since financing for local government units often vary and the benefits package for insurance plans may be unfavorable, some communities face difficulties accessing public health services. Shifting the responsibility of healthcare from the federal government to the local governments has increased local authority and has made communities susceptible to lack of access to basic services. In addition, most healthcare payments are made out of pocket, especially when receiving care from privately owned institutions. Barangay health stations serve as primary public health facilities and are staffed by doctors, nurses, midwives, and barangay health volunteers.

There is no requirement in the Philippines for causes of death to be medically determined prior to registration of a death, so national statistics as to causes of death in the Philippines cannot be accurately substantiated. In the provinces, especially in places more remote from registries, births and deaths are often not recorded unless some family need arises, such as entry into college. When there is no legal process needed to pass on inheritance, the recording of deaths is viewed as unnecessary by the family.

Population 
As of September 2020, Philippine has a population of nearly 110 million and a population density of 368 per Km2. 32% of the population of, Philippine are under 15 years old, and only 22.2% are over 60. In the Philippines, 16.6% of the population lived below the national poverty line in 2018.

Health Indicators

Health Problems in The Philippines 
The Philippines faces a large burden of disease:

The main Non-Communicable Diseases are Diabetes, Heart disease, Stroke, Cancer, and Chronic diseases that affect the airways and lungs. While these diseases affect different parts of the body in different ways, they often share common origins.  

Communicable diseases: Acute Respiratory Infection, Influenza A (H1N1), Bird Flu (Avian Influenza), Chickenpox, Cholera, Dengue, Diarrhea, Hand, Foot, and Mouth Disease, Hepatitis A, Hepatitis B, Hepatitis C, HIV/AIDS, Influenza, Leprosy, Malaria, Measles, Meningococcemia, Pertussis, Poliomyelitis, Rabies, Severe Acute Respiratory Syndrome (SARS), Sore Eyes, Tuberculosis, Typhoid Fever

See also
 Health care in the Philippines
 HIV/AIDS in the Philippines
 Smoking in the Philippines
 Water supply and sanitation in the Philippines
 Nutrition Foundation of the Philippines, Inc.
 National Nutrition Council (Philippines)

References

External links

Teaching and Health Care during Spanish Rule (in English and Spanish)
Franciscan Hospitals during Spanish Rule
History of the Public Health System in the Philippines